The  is a railway line in Osaka Prefecture, Japan, operated by the private railway  operator . The line connects Izumi-Chūō Station and Nakamozu Station, with through operations to and from the Nankai Kōya Line up to Namba Station in southern downtown Osaka.

Services

■ (LE) 
All seats are reserved. Operations started on 5 December 2015. Trains pass Sakaihigashi and Fukai non-stop for the first time.

■ (SbE)
Operated all day, through to Namba.

■ (SmE)
Trains are operated all day, through to Namba.

■ (L)
Operated all day. Mainly shuttles between Nakamozu and Izumi-Chūō (some trains for Komyoike). During the daytime and late at night, some services operate between Izumi-Chūō and Namba.

List of stations
All stations are located in Osaka Prefecture.
O: Trains stop.
|: Trains pass. 
See Nankai Koya Line article for the stops of the through trains to Namba between Namba and Nakamozu.

Rolling stock
, the railway operated a fleet of 108 electric multiple unit (EMU) vehicles, all based at Nakamozu Depot.

Semboku Liner limited express services
Semboku 12000 series EMU
Nankai 11000 series EMU (sometimes substituted by Nankai 12000 series)
Nankai 50000 series EMUs (since November 2022)

From 27 January 2017, a new Semboku 12000 series EMU was introduced on Semboku Liner services.

Local services
Semboku 3000 series two- and four-car EMUs with stainless steel bodies
Semboku 5000 series eight-car EMUs with aluminium bodies
Semboku 7000 series two-, four-, and six-car EMUs with aluminium bodies
Semboku 7020 series two-, four-, and six-car EMUs with aluminium bodies

Former rolling stock
 Semboku 100 series

Future rolling stock
 Semboku 9300 series four-car EMUs with stainless steel bodies (to be introduced Q3 2023)

History
The section from Nakamozu to Izumigaoka opened on 1 April 1971, with  double track and electrified at 600 V DC. The overhead line voltage was increased to 1,500 V DC from 7 October 1973, and the line was extended to Toga-Mikita on 7 December 1973.

The line was extended to Komyoike on 20 August 1977, and to Izumi-Chuo on 1 April 1995.

See also
 List of railway lines in Japan

References

External links
  

 
Railway companies of Japan
Rail transport in Osaka Prefecture
Nankai Group
1971 establishments in Japan
Railway lines in highway medians
Railway lines opened in 1971